Vik Muniz (born 1961) is a Brazilian artist and photographer. Initially a sculptor, Muniz grew interested with the photographic representations of his work, eventually focusing completely on photography. Primarily working with unconventional materials such as tomato sauce, diamonds, magazine clippings, chocolate syrup, dust, dirt, etc., Muniz creates works of art, referencing old master's paintings and celebrity portraits, among other things, and then photographs them. His work has been met with both commercial success and critical acclaim, and has been exhibited worldwide. He is currently represented by Galeria Nara Roesler based in New York and Brazil.

In 2010, Muniz was featured in the documentary film Waste Land. Directed by Lucy Walker, the film highlights Muniz's work in one of the world's largest garbage dumps, Jardim Gramacho, on the outskirts of Rio de Janeiro. The film was nominated to the Academy Award for Best Documentary Feature at the 83rd Academy Awards.

Early life
Vik Muniz was born in 1961 in São Paulo, Brazil, as the only child of Maria Celeste, a telephone operator, and Vincente Muniz, a restaurant waiter. Muniz’s grandmother, Ana Rocha, taught him how to read at an early age. In his memoir, Muniz recalled struggling with writing in school which is why he turned to visuals to communicate his thoughts. At the age of 14, his math teacher recommended him to enter an art contest. He won and was awarded a partial scholarship to an art studio.

Career

Early career 
At the age of 18, Muniz got his first job working in the advertising industry in Brazil, redesigning billboards for higher readability. While on the way to his first black-tie gala, Muniz witnessed and attempted to break up a street fight, where he was accidentally shot in the leg by one of the brawlers. He was paid by the shooter to not press charges and used the money to travel to the USA ,Chicago, in 1983. In Chicago, Muniz worked at a local supermarket cleaning the parking lot while he attended night school to study English. In the English class, he learned Polish, Italian, Spanish, and Korean without any improvements to his English vocabulary. Later, Muniz attended culinary and carpentry classes where he learned most of his English.

Muniz took his first trip to New York in 1984. There, he visited the Museum of Modern Art and met a woman who changed his thoughts on Jackson Pollock’s paintings. This also influenced Muniz to move to New York just two months after his first visit. Muniz's friend lent him a studio where he started his career as a sculptor. He was 28 when he had his first solo exhibit in 1989.

Influences and technique 

Inspired by works of Man Ray and Max Ernst, Muniz executes simple imagery intricately. Marshall McLuhan’s Understanding Media  encouraged Muniz to explore perception in the media through abstraction and manipulating the components of the image. He cites the mosaics in a church in Ravenna as one of his influences and is also a self-proclaimed student of Buster Keaton.  He decided to become an artist after seeing the works of the Postmodernists Cindy Sherman and Jeff Koons. Muniz, like both of these artists, reworks popular imagery in his work. Muniz says that he does not believe in originals, but rather believes in individuality. Muniz works to re-purpose themes and showcase them in a different light for the viewer.

Muniz is best known for recreating famous imagery from art history and pop culture with unexpected, everyday objects, and photographing them. For example, Muniz's Action Photo, After Hans Namuth (From Pictures of Chocolate), a Cibachrome print, is a Bosco Chocolate Syrup recreation of one of Hans Namuth's photographs of Jackson Pollock in his studio. The monumental series Pictures of Cars (after Ruscha) is his social commentary of the car culture of Los Angeles utilizing Ed Ruscha's 60's Pop masterpieces rendered from car ephemera. Muniz often works on a large scale and then he destroys the originals of his work and only the photo of his work remains.

Muniz has spoken of wanting to make "color pictures that talked about color and also talked about the practical simplification of such impossible concepts." He also has an interest in making pictures that "reveal their process and material structure," and describes himself as having been "a willing bystander in the middle of the shootout between structuralist and post-structuralist critique."

Muniz says that when he takes photographs, he intuitively searches for "a vantage point that would make the picture identical to the ones in my head before I’d made the works," so that his photographs match those mental images. He sees photography as having "freed painting from its responsibility to depict the world as fact."

In Muniz's earthworks series, Pictures of Earthworks, show a strong resemblance to the 1970s Earthworks movement. However unlike the Earthworks movement, that were influenced by ancient cultures, Muniz's series shows distinct human impact on nature.

Political and social themes 
In addition to sculpting, Muniz experiments with drawing and photography, which is seen in the series Sugar Children, featured in the Museum of Modern Art's New Photography 13 show, alongside Rineke Dijikstra, An-My Le, and Kunié Sugiura, in 1997. In Sugar Children, Muniz photographed the families that worked on sugar plantations on the Caribbean island of St. Kitts. Beginning with Polaroids of several of the children of plantation workers, Muniz "drew" the images by sprinkling sugar on black paper and rephotographed these compositions. This series was met with criticism, where scholars have pointed out that he photographs of subjects continuing to live in poverty and yet can make upwards of 5 figures on these works at auction.

Muniz donated the profits from his Pictures in Garbage series, close to $50,000 of which came from the sale of Marat (Sebastiao) at an auction in the UK, to the workers collective Associação dos Catadores do Aterro Metropolitano de Jardim Gramacho (Association of Collectors of the Metropolitan Landfill of Jardim Gramacho). He also tries to make art more accessible through the use of common materials, because of his belief that the art world should not be just for the elite. In the documentary Waste Land, Muniz stated that "I'm at this point in my career where I'm trying to step away from the realm of fine arts because I think it's a very exclusive, very restrictive place to be. What I want to be able to do is to change the lives of people with the same materials they deal with every day."

Publications
 Clayton Days – Published by Frick Art & Historical Center, 2000.  
 Jelly, Garbage + Toys: Making Pictures with Vik Muniz – Published by Harry N. Abrams, 2017.  
 Natura Pictrix : Interviews and Essays on Photography – Published by New York : Edgewise, 2003.  
 Vik Muniz: Model Pictures – Published by The Menil Foundation, 2002.  
 Vik Muniz. – Published by Gary Tatintsian Gallery, 2007.
 Vik Muniz: Reflex: A Vik Muniz Primer. – Published by Aperture, 2005.  
 Vik Muniz: Verso – Published by Verlag für moderne Kunst, 2019

Solo exhibitions (selected)
To see the full list of selected solo exhibitions, visit his website
2018: Vik Muniz. Gary Tatintsian Gallery, Moscow, Russia. June 8 — October 10.
2016: Vik Muniz: Verso. Mauritshuis, The Hague, Netherlands. June 9 – September 4.
2015: Vik Muniz: Poetics of Perceptions. Taubman Museum of Art, VA. June 13 – September 12, 2015.
2015: Vik Muniz: Mas Acá de la Imagen. Museo de La Universidad Tres de Febrero- Buenos Aires, Argentina. May 21, 2015 
2014: Vik Muniz: Pictures of Anything. Tel Aviv Museum of Art, Tel Aviv, Israel. March 27 – July 21, 2014.
2013: Vik Muniz: Espelhos de Papel. Nara Roesler Gallery. São Paulo, Brazil. Feb 4 – November 5.
2012: VIK. Centro de Arte Contemporánea de Málaga, Málaga, Spain,  September 7 – December 2.
 2009: Vik. Museu de Arte de São Paulo (MASP). São Paulo, Brazil. April 25 – July 19.
 2008: Vik Muniz. Arndt & Partner, Berlin, Germany. October 29 – December 20.
 2007: Vik Muniz: Russian Project. Gary Tatintsian Gallery, Moscow, Russia. November 1, 2007 — January 30, 2008. 
 2007: Imaginary Prisons, G. B. Piranesi and Vik Muniz. National Gallery of Victoria. Melbourne, Australia. April 19 – September 30.
 2007: Vik Muniz Reflex. P.S. 1. MoMA. Long Island City, NY. February 11 – May 7.
 2006: Vik Muniz Reflex. Pérez Art Museum Miami. Miami, Florida. February 10 – May 28.
 2002: Vik Muniz: Model Pictures, The Menil Collection, Houston. February 22 – June 9.
 2000: Clayton Days. The Frick Art & Historical Center, Pittsburgh, Pennsylvania.  September 8 – October 29.
 1999: Vik Muniz. Centre national de la photographie, Paris, France. November 17 – January 10, 2000.
 1998: Seeing is Believing. International Center of Photography, New York, NY.
 1996: The Sugar Children. Tricia Collins Contemporary Art, New York, NY.

Curatorial projects
Buzz. Curated by Vik Muniz, Galeria Nara Roesler (Roesler Hotel #21), São Paulo, Brazil. December 1, 2012 – February 16, 2013.
Rio de Janeiro Art Week, Rio de Janeiro, Brazil. July 22 – 29, 2010.
Robert Mapplethorpe. Curated by Vik Muniz. Fortes Vilaça Gallery. São Paulo, Brazil. March 4 – April 9, 2009.
Artist’s Choice: Vik Muniz, Rebus. MoMA – Museum of Modern Art. New York, NY. December 11, 2008 – February 23, 2009.
Haptic: Three Brazilian and Three Japanese Artists. Tokyo Wonder Site. Hongo, Tokyo, Japan. November 22, 2008 – January 12, 2009.
Robert Mapplethorpe. Curated by Vik Muniz. Fortes Vilaça Gallery, São Paulo, Brazil. March 4 – April 9, 2006.
Identity V. Curated by Hiroshi Minamishima. Nichido Contemporary Art. Tokyo, Japan. June 26 – July 25, 2005.
L’Empire bresilien et ses photograhes: collections de la Bibliotheque nationale du Brésil et de L’Institute Moreira Salles. “L’horizont Perdu.” Musée d’Orsay, Paris. 2005.
Vik Muniz. Curated by Miguel Fernandez-Cid. Indianapolis Museum of Contemporary Art. Indianapolis, IN. February – March, 2003.
Making it Real. Catalogue ed. Independent Incorporated, NY. ICI – Independent Curators International, 1997 (traveling exhibition).

Awards
2013 – Crystal Award by the World Economic Forum. Davos-Klosters, Switzerland.
2010 – Honored with the Ordem do Ipiranga by the governor José Serra. São Paulo, Brazil, March 17.
2009 – Honored with the Medalha da Inconfidência by the governor of Minas Gerais, Mr. Aécio Neves. Minas Gerais, Brazil, April 21.
2009 – Honored with the Prêmio Cidadão Carioca by the State of Rio de Janeiro, Rio de Janeiro, Brazil.
2008 – Honored at CITYarts’ 40th Anniversary sponsored by Dr. Miriam & Sheldon G. Adelson, Candia Fisher, Winston Fisher, and chaired by Jane Holzer. New York, NY.
2007 – Society for News Design Annual Creative Competition Award of Excellence in the category of Magazine Cover Design for the cover of The New York Times Magazine.
2005 – Premio Villa de Madrid de Fotografía “Kaulak" awarded by the Ayuntamiento de Madrid, Madrid, Spain.
2005 – National Artist Award granted by the Anderson Ranch Arts Center, Aspen, Colorado.
1999 – Líderes Latinoamericanos para el Nuevo Milenio. CNN Time. NY, USA.
1998 – Best Photography Exhibition, Second Place: Vik Muniz: Seeing is Believing. Awarded by The International Center of Photography and curated by Charles Stainback.

References

External links
 
 Video interview with Vik Muniz on Equivalents (The Museum of Modern Art)
 
 
 
 
 Vik Muniz, Angélica from the Aftermath series, 1998 at the NSU Art Museum Fort Lauderdale; promised gift of Pearl and Stanley Goodman

1961 births
Living people
Brazilian emigrants to the United States
Brazilian contemporary artists
Brazilian photographers
Bard College faculty
UNESCO Goodwill Ambassadors
Recycled art artists